The Rural Municipality of Riverside is a former rural municipality (RM) in the Canadian province of Manitoba. It was originally incorporated as a rural municipality on December 22, 1883. It ceased on January 1, 2015 as a result of its provincially mandated amalgamation with the RM of Strathcona to form the Rural Municipality of Prairie Lakes.

Communities 
 Dunrea
 Margaret
 Ninette

References

External links 
 Official website
 Map of Riverside R.M. at Statcan

Riverside
Populated places disestablished in 2015
2015 disestablishments in Manitoba